Elections to Derry City Council were held on 5 May 2005 on the same day as the other Northern Irish local government elections. The election used five district electoral areas to elect a total of 30 councillors.

Election results

Note: "Votes" are the first preference votes.

Districts summary

|- class="unsortable" align="centre"
!rowspan=2 align="left"|Ward
! % 
!Cllrs
! % 
!Cllrs
! %
!Cllrs
! %
!Cllrs
! % 
!Cllrs
!rowspan=2|TotalCllrs
|- class="unsortable" align="center"
!colspan=2 bgcolor="" | SDLP
!colspan=2 bgcolor="" | Sinn Féin
!colspan=2 bgcolor="" | DUP
!colspan=2 bgcolor="" | UUP
!colspan=2 bgcolor="white"| Others
|-
|align="left"|Cityside
|35.8
|2
|bgcolor="#008800"|53.2
|bgcolor="#008800"|3
|0.0
|0
|0.0
|0
|11.0
|0
|5
|-
|align="left"|Northland
|bgcolor="#99FF66"|54.2
|bgcolor="#99FF66"|4
|40.1
|3
|0.0
|0
|0.0
|0
|5.7
|0
|7
|-
|align="left"|Rural
|bgcolor="#99FF66"|35.8
|bgcolor="#99FF66"|3
|18.3
|1
|28.0
|2
|10.2
|0
|7.7
|0
|6
|-
|align="left"|Shantallow
|bgcolor="#99FF66"|54.1
|bgcolor="#99FF66"|3
|42.4
|2
|0.0
|0
|0.0
|0
|3.5
|0
|5
|-
|align="left"|Waterside
|22.1
|2
|16.3
|1
|bgcolor="#D46A4C"|48.7
|bgcolor="#D46A4C"|3
|10.8
|1
|2.1
|0
|7
|-
|- class="unsortable" class="sortbottom" style="background:#C9C9C9"
|align="left"| Total
|41.0
|14
|32.8
|10
|16.1
|5
|4.4
|1
|5.7
|0
|30
|-
|}

District results

Cityside

2001: 3 x Sinn Féin, 2 x SDLP
2005: 3 x Sinn Féin, 2 x SDLP
2001-2005 Change: No change

Northland

2001: 4 x SDLP, 3 x Sinn Féin
2005: 4 x SDLP, 3 x Sinn Féin
2001-2005 Change: No change

Rural

2001: 3 x SDLP, 1 x DUP, 1 x Sinn Féin, 1 x UUP
2005: 3 x SDLP, 2 x DUP, 1 x Sinn Féin
2001-2005 Change: DUP gain from UUP

Shantallow

2001: 3 x SDLP, 2 x Sinn Féin
2005: 3 x SDLP, 2 x Sinn Féin
2001-2005 Change: No change

Waterside

2001: 3 x DUP, 2 x SDLP, 1 x Sinn Féin, 1 x UUP
2005: 3 x DUP, 2 x SDLP, 1 x Sinn Féin, 1 x UUP
2001-2005 Change: No change

References

Derry City Council elections
Derry